The 2021–22 Ranji Trophy was the 87th season of the Ranji Trophy, the premier first-class cricket tournament in India. It was contested by 38 teams, divided into eight elite groups, with six teams in Plate group . All the Plate Group league matches took place in Kolkata. The tournament was announced by the Board of Control for Cricket in India (BCCI) on 3 July 2021.

In the opening round of fixtures, Sakibul Gani of Bihar became the first player to score a triple century on their first-class debut, scoring 341 runs. Nagaland won the Plate Group to progress to the knockout stage of the tournament.

Points table

Fixtures

Round 1

Round 2

Round 3

References

Ranji Trophy seasons